The Tyler metropolitan area, or Greater Tyler area centered on the city of Tyler, Texas, is one of the largest Texan metropolitan areas in East Texas. It had a combined population of 216,080 according to the 2010 U.S. census. The Tyler metropolitan area encompasses all of Smith County.

Geography

The county commissioners court appointed a new county engineer in 2005 and initiated an aggressive reconstruction campaign. After the election of 2006, this reconstruction campaign was cut back by the court. During this period, a controversial pay increase for commissioners and the county judge was passed by a 3-2 vote. After heated protests from the public, the pay rates were eventually rolled back and new legislation was proposed in the state legislature to prohibit commissioners and county judges from authorizing raises for themselves during their first term of office.

Major highways

 Interstate 20
 U.S. Highway 69
 U.S. Highway 80
 U.S. Highway 271
 State Highway 31
 State Highway 57
 State Highway 64
 State Highway 110
 State Highway 135
 State Highway 155
 Loop 49
 Loop 323

Communities

Cities

Arp
Hideaway
New Chapel Hill
Noonday
Overton (partially in Rusk County)
Tyler (Principal City)
Troup (partially in Cherokee County)
Whitehouse

Towns
Bullard (partially in Cherokee County)
Lindale
Winona

Unincorporated communities

Bascom
Carroll
Chapel Hill
Copeland
Elberta
Flint
Garden Valley
Gresham
Jamestown
Midway
Mount Sylvan
New Hope
Owentown
Pine Springs
Red Springs
Shadygrove
Starrville
Swan
Teaselville
Thedford

Demographics

As of the census of 2010,  209,714 people and 76,427 households were residing in the county. The population density was 227.6 people per square mile (73/km2).  The 87,309 housing units averaged 91.9 per mi2.  The racial makeup of the county was 70.1% White, 17.9% African American, 0.5% Native American, 1.2% Asian, and 2.0% persons reporting two or more races.  About 17.2% of the population was Hispanic or Latino of any race.

Of the 76,427 households, 34.8% had children under the age of 18 living with them, 51.8% were married couples living together, 13.3% had a female householder with no husband present, and 30.7% were not families; 25.3% of all households were made up of a householder living alone. The average household size was 2.60, and the average family size was 3.13.

The median income for a household in the county was $46,139. The per capita income for the county was $25,374. About 15.4% of families and 13.80% of the population were below the poverty line.

In the county, the age distribution was  26.60% under the age of 18, 9.80% from 18 to 24, 27.40% from 25 to 44, 22.10% from 45 to 64, and 14.10% who were 65 or older. The median age was 36 years. For every 100 females, there were 92.10 males. For every 100 females age 18 and over, there were 87.90 males.

The county has been unable to house about 30% of its inmate population since 2000 in its own facilities, and spends around 10% of its annual budget (estimated to be $62 million in 2007) for housing prisoners in out-of-county facilities, but this figure should be adjusted because the county currently spends $35.00 per day housing prisoners in its own facility, and $40.00 for housing them in other counties, so the differential cost is $5.00 per day, and the cost for 2007 is adjusted to $638,000.00. According to official state of Texas records, Smith County now incarcerates its residents at a rate twice as high as the state average.

Economy

In addition to its role in the rose-growing industry, Tyler is the headquarters for Brookshire Grocery Company, which operates Brookshire's, Fresh and Super 1 Foods, and Ole! supermarkets in Texas, Louisiana, and Arkansas. The company's main distribution center is located in south Tyler, while SouthWest Foods, a subsidiary that processes dairy products, is located just northeast of the city. Adams Engineering has also made its headquarters in Tyler.

The manufacturing sector includes:
 Tyler Pipe, a subsidiary of McWane Inc. that produces soil and utility pipe products
 Trane, a business of Ingersoll-Rand, formerly a unit of American Standard Companies, which manufactures air conditioners and heat pumps (this plant was originally built in 1955 by General Electric)
 Carrier, which manufactures air conditioners
 Delek Refining, an Israeli-owned oil refinery formerly La Gloria Oil and Gas Co (a Crown Central Petroleum subsidiary)
 Ferguson Beauregard, an operating company of Dover Corporation that specializes in equipment for the measurement and production of natural gas using the plunger lift method
 DYNAenergetics Tyler Distribution Center, part of DYNAenergetics USA, which manufactures perforating equipment and explosives for the oil and gas industry
 Vesuvius USA, manufacturer of refractory ceramics used in the steel industry
Cavender's Boot City, a large regional western wear retailer and manufacturer

Also produced in Tyler are John Soules Foods' fajita and other meat products, Greenberg's smoked turkeys, Distant Lands Coffee Roasters coffee, Tyler Candle Co. jar candles, Tyler Products, and a variety of small, high-tech businesses, including Spade Design, SEO Skyrocket, Synthesizers.com, F3 Technology Solutions, Wood Networks, Group M7, CBI, Power-Up, and Arrick Robotics.

Tyler is also a major medical center, which serves the city, as well as the surrounding East Texas area.

According to the city's 2012-2013 Comprehensive Annual Financial Report, the top-10 employers in the city are:

Recreation and tourism
Annually, the Texas Rose Festival draws thousands of tourists to Tyler.  The festival, which celebrates the role of the rose-growing industry in the local economy, is held in October and features a parade, the coronation of the Rose Queen, and other civic events. The Rose Museum features the history of the Festival. Tyler is home to Caldwell Zoo, several local museums, Lake Palestine, Lake Tyler, and numerous golf courses and country clubs.  A few miles away in Flint, TX is The WaterPark @ The Villages, a year-round, indoor water park. There is also an "Azalea Trail" in Tyler, which are two officially designated routes within the city that showcase homes or other landscaped venues adorned with azalea shrubs. Tyler State Park is a few miles away where visitors can camp, canoe, and paddle boat on the lake. Activities include picnicking; camping; boating (motors allowed - 5 mph speed limit); boat rentals; fishing; birding; hiking; mountain biking and hiking trails; lake swimming (in unsupervised swimming area); and nature study. The Smith County Historical Society operates a museum and archives in the old Carnegie Library.
The East Texas State Fair is held annually in Tyler.
Lake Tyler was the location of the HGTV Dream Home contest in 2005.  The 6,500-ft2 (600-m3) house briefly boosted tourism and interest in the community. It subsequently was sold at public auction in January, 2008, for $1.325 million.

Colleges and universities

Tyler's higher education institutions include the University of Texas at Tyler and the University of Texas Health Center at Tyler, both part of the University of Texas System, as well as Tyler Junior College and Texas College.

Healthcare
Hospitals located in Tyler include East Texas Medical Center, Trinity Mother Frances Health System, University of Texas Health Center at Tyler, and Texas Spine and Joint Hospital. Its many clinics also include the Direct Care Clinic.

Media
Currently, 18 media outlets and one newspaper are located in Tyler, as well as many more in the surrounding areas.

Newspaper
Tyler Morning Telegraph

Television

Radio

AM stations

FM stations

Sports

College and university teams
 University of Texas at Tyler Patriots (NCAA)
 Tyler Junior College Apaches (NJCAA)
 Texas College Steers

Baseball teams
 Tyler Elbertas (1912)
 Tyler Trojans (1924–1929, 1931, 1935–1940, 1946–1950)
 Tyler Sports (1932)
 Tyler Governors (1933–1934)
 Tyler East Texans (1950–1953)
 Tyler Tigers (1954–1955)
 Tyler Wildcatters (1994–1997)
 Tyler Roughnecks (2001)

Football
 East Texas Twisters (2004)

Road races
 Fresh 15 Road Race (annual)

Transportation

As with much of modern America, the automobile is the most common form of transportation. Tyler is a nexus of several major highways. Interstate 20 runs along the north edge of the city going east and west, U.S. Highway 69 runs north-south through the center of town and State Highway 64 runs east-west through the city. Tyler also has access to U.S. Highway 271, State Highway 31, State Highway 155, and State Highway 110. Loop 323 was established in 1957 and originally encircled the city, which has continued to grow outside of this loop. Loop 49 was designed to be an "outer loop" around the city and currently runs from State Highway 110 to Interstate 20 west of Tyler. Future segments will extend Loop 49 to Interstate 20 east of Tyler and to other East Texas cities.

Public transportation
Tyler Transit provides customers with public-transportation service within Tyler. The buses run daily, excluding Sundays and holidays. Tyler Transit offers customers the option to purchase tickets, tokens, or passes at the Tyler Transit office, located at 210 E. Oakwood Street inside the Cotton Belt Railroad Depot at the main transfer point. The City of Tyler paratransit service is a shared-ride, public-transportation service. Requests for service must be made the day before the service is needed. Trips can be scheduled up to 14 days in advance. ADA complimentary paratransit service is provided to all origins and destinations within the service area defined as the city limits of Tyler.
 Greyhound Lines bus service is available through a downtown terminal. Smith County offers a voucher system for elderly and disabled citizens through a federal grant section 5310 program administered by the Texas Department of Transportation. This program is intended to accommodate the elderly and persons with disabilities above and beyond the existing public transportation programs.

Via air
Tyler Pounds Regional Airport offers service to Dallas/Fort Worth International Airport via American Eagle and to Houston's George Bush Intercontinental Airport via United Express.

Via train
Tyler was the hub for a series of short-line railroads, which later evolved into the St. Louis Southwestern Railway, better known as the "Cotton Belt Route," with the city last being a stop on the unnamed successor to the Morning Star between St. Louis and Dallas. This line later became part of the Southern Pacific Railroad, which itself merged with the Union Pacific Railroad, which continues to serve the city today with freight traffic. No passenger train service to Tyler has occurred since April 1956, but Amtrak's Texas Eagle runs through the city of Mineola, a short distance north of Tyler.

Walkability
A 2014 study by Walk Score ranked Tyler with a walkability score of 32 (out of 100) with some amenities within walking distance.

References

Tyler, Texas
Smith County, Texas
History of Tyler, Texas